The Punchbowl Formation is a sedimentary sandstone geologic formation in the northern San Gabriel Mountains, above the Antelope Valley in Los Angeles County, southern California.

Geology 
The sandstone beds of the formation are exposed in the walls of the Devil's Punchbowl, a scenic gorge within the Devil's Punchbowl Natural Area, an L.A. County park within the Angeles National Forest. Three separate faults have folded and uplifted the formation in view. The Devil's Punchbowl is a large plunging sandstone syncline, where the edges of the formation have been folded upward, and the center has dipped.  It was formed by the Punchbowl Fault, which is near the San Andreas Fault to the north.

A distinct basal member is middle Miocene in age. The underlying Paradise Springs and Vasquez Formations were formerly interpreted as either part of the basal Punchbowl Formation, or deposits in a fault-bounded sliver along the Punchbowl Fault that originated in a separate basin.

The Devil's Punchbowl drainage flows into Sandrock Creek, a tributary of Big Rock Creek, which disappears into the Mojave Desert.

Fossil content 
The uplifted formation preserves fossils dating back to the Neogene period of the Cenozoic geologic era, formed during the lower Pliocene to upper Miocene Ages (~5-10 million years ago).

Mammals

Artiodactyls 

 Aepycamelus alexandrae
 Bouromeryx americanus
 Brachycrus cf. buwaldi
 Dyseohyus fricki
 Pseudoparablastomeryx cf. scotti
 Brachycrus sp.
 Plioceros sp.
 Antilocapridae indet.
 Blastomerycinae indet.
 Camelidae indet.
 ?Merycoidodontidae indet.
 Tayassuidae indet.

Perissodactyls 

 Archaeohippus mourningi
 Parapliohippus cf. carrizoensis
 Pliohippus cf. tehonensis
 Scaphohippus intermontanus
 S. sumani
 Cormohipparion sp.
 ?Archaeohippus sp.
 Equini indet.
 Hipparionini indet.
 Rhinocerotidae indet.

Carnivora 

 Borophagus cf. secundus
 Leptarctus ancipidens
 Plionictis sp.

Rodents 
 Petauristodon sp.
 Sciuridae indet.

Reptiles

Turtles 
 Gopherus depressus

Gallery

See also 

 List of fossiliferous stratigraphic units in California
 
 Paleontology in California
 Diligencia Formation
 Mint Canyon Formation
 Plush Ranch Formation

References

Bibliography

External links 

 Los Angeles County: Devil's Punchbowl Natural Area website
 Devil's Punchbowl photos gallery — geology + flora

Geologic formations of California
Miocene Series of North America
Miocene California
Langhian
Serravallian
Tortonian
Clarendonian
Hemphillian
Conglomerate formations
Sandstone formations of the United States
Alluvial deposits
Fluvial deposits
Paleontology in California
Geology of Los Angeles County, California
San Gabriel Mountains
Angeles National Forest